Yuzuru Hanyu is a Japanese figure skater who began his career in 2004 and competed at senior level for the first time in 2010. Throughout his career, Hanyu has won the Olympics twice (2014, 2018) and achieved a Super Slam for having won all major competitions in his senior and junior career. He is the first skater in history to successfully land a quadruple loop jump in competition and has broken world records nineteen timesthe most times amongst singles skaters since the introduction of the ISU Judging System in 2004. He is the historical world record holder for the men's short program, free skating and combined total score. He is also the first man to have received over 100 points in the men's short program, over 200 points in the men's free skate, and over 300 total points in competition. In recognition of his achievements, Hanyu has been awarded numerous accolades. He is the youngest recipient of the People's Honor Award (in 2018) by the Prime Minister of Japan, and nominated for the Laureus World Sports Award for Comeback of the Year (in 2019).

World record scores
Hanyu has set seven world record scores in the +5/-5 Grade of Execution (GOE) system, three in the short program and two in the free skating and the combined total score. At the 2018 Grand Prix of Helsinki he reset all three world records in one event.

Hanyu broke twelve world records before the 2018–19 season, seven in the short program, three in the free skating, and two in the combined total score. At the 2015 NHK Trophy and the 2015–16 Grand Prix Final he reset the world records in all three competition segments at back-to-back events.

Firsts and other records

Awards and honors

People's Honor Award
Awarded in 2018

Japan Medals of Honor
Purple Ribbon (2014, 2018)

Kikuchi Kan Prize
Awarded in 2022

Laureus World Sports Awards
Comeback of the Year – nominated in 2019

International Skating Union (ISU)
"Most Valuable Skater" (2020)

Japanese Olympic Committee
JOC Sports Award – Newcomer Award (2009), Best Award (2013), Special Achievement Award (2015), Special Honor Award (2018)
Olympic Special Award (2014, 2018)

Japan Skating Federation
JOC Cup (Most Valuable Player Award) (2014, 2015, 2016, 2017, 2018, 2020)

Waseda University
Azusa Ono Memorial Award (2021)
Alumni Association Toukon Award (2021)

Public Relations Society of Japan (PRSJ)
"Person of the Year" (2022)

Media
Asahi Shimbun: Asahi Sports Award (2014)
Business Insider: "Most Dominant Athletes Alive" (#33 in 2014, #21 in 2015)
Chunichi Shimbun: 29th "Chunichi Sports Award" (2015)
ESPN: "World Fame 100" (#70 in 2018, #64 in 2019), "The Dominant 20" #11 (2018)
Forbes: 30 Under 30 Asia (2018)
Japan Newspaper Publishers and Editors Association: "Happy News Person Award" (2018)
Kahoku Shinpo: 64th "Hebei Cultural Award" (2014)
Mainichi Shimbun: 22nd "Daily Sports People Award" Grand Prix (2014)
Marca: "The 100 Best Male Sportsmen of the 21st Century" #62 (2020)
Sports Graphic Number: 33rd "MVP Award" (2014)
Oricon News: "Top 10 Favorite Athletes" Male category (#3 in 2014 and 2016, #1 in 2017, #2 in 2018–2021)
Tohoku Sports Press Club: Sports Award (2011, 2014, 2015, 2016, 2018)
Tokyo Sports Press Club: Special Award (2012), Skater of the Year (2014, 2015, 2018)
TV Asahi: "Big Sports Awards" (2014, 2015, 2016, 2017, 2018), "Special Sports Broadcasting Award" (2019)
Xinhua News Agency: "Top 10 Worlds Athletes/Sports Personalities" (#7 in 2018, #5 in 2020)
Yahoo! Japan: "Yahoo! Search Awards" Grand Prize & Athlete Category (2014), Special Category & Athlete Category (2018), Grand Prize & Athlete Category (2022)
Yomiuri Shimbun: "Japan Sports Awards" Grand Prix (2014, 2018)

Municipality
Miyagi "Citizens' Honor Award" (2014, 2018)
Miyagi "Chairman of Prefectural Assembly's Special Award" (2014, 2018)
Sendai "Chairman of City Assembly's Special Award" (2018)
Sendai "Plaque of tribute" (2014, 2018)
Sendai "Sports Awards" (2010, 2011, 2012, 2013)
Sendai "Monument of Figure Skating" (2017, 2019)
Tokyo "Honor Award" (2018)
Tokyo "Sports Grand Prize" (2018)

Medals and major titles

Super Slam

The Career Super Grand Slam or Super Slam is an achievement of winning all major international figure skating events at both junior and senior level, namely the Olympics, senior and junior Worlds, Four Continents or European Championships as well as the senior and junior Grand Prix Final at any point during the course of a career. With his win at the 2020 Four Continents Championships, Hanyu became the first skater in the men's singles discipline to complete the Super Slam.

Medal record by event

Medal record by season

International record scores

International record scores by segment

Hanyu is the current record holder for the program component score in the men's short program. The other six record scores were set by Nathan Chen.

Hanyu holds the record for all historical best scores in the +3/-3 GOE system except the technical element score in the free skating, which was set by Nathan Chen in 2018.

International record scores by event

Only records at main international senior events are listed, namely the Olympics (individual event), Worlds, Four Continents, and the Grand Prix Final (Europeans are excluded as Hanyu is not eligible for that event). Hanyu holds the current event record score for the short program and the combined total score at the Four Continents Championships. Shoma Uno set the Four Continents record for the free skating and Nathan Chen the remaining seven event records.

Hanyu set nine of the twelve historical record scores at main international events, among them the records in all three competition segments at the World Championships and the Grand Prix Final. The other three records were set by Nathan Chen.

International maximum scores

Technical elements

A technical element is awarded a perfect score if it is credited with the full base value by the technical panel and the maximum grade of execution after dropping the highest and lowest mark across the judging panel (+3GOE before and +5GOE since the 2018–19 season). In the current system, Hanyu has received one perfect score for a technical element in international competition, namely his triple Axel jump in the short program at the 2019 Skate Canada International.

Before the system change, Hanyu was awarded a total of 28 maximum scores, covering all types of technical elements in the men's singles discipline: three different solo jumps, two jump combinations, one spin, the step sequence, and the choreographic sequence. Seven elements received unanimous +3GOE from all judges in the panel: four triple Axels, a quadruple Salchow, a choreo sequence, and his step sequence in the short program at the 2016 World Championships. However, that element did not earn a maximum score because it was downgraded by the technical panel to Level3 and did not reach the full base value.

Hanyu's most successful season by maximum scores was in the 2015–16 season. He was awarded a perfect score for twelve technical elements and maximum GOE for another three step sequences that did not reach full base value due to level downgrades. Before the 2014–15 season, Hanyu did not receive any maximum scores for single technical elements in international competition.

Program components
A program component is awarded a maximum score if it receives marks of 10.00 from all judges after dropping the highest and lowest mark across the panel. The five components until the 2022–23 season were skating skills (SS), transitions (TR), performance (PE), composition (CO), and interpretation (IN). At the 2015–16 Grand Prix Final, Hanyu was awarded a perfect 10.00 in his short program for the performance component.

National record scores

National record scores by segment

Hanyu holds the current and historical Japanese national record scores for all competition segments in the senior men's singles discipline. He also holds all six event records at the Japan Figure Skating Championships.

National maximum scores
Hanyu has received a total of eleven maximum scores for technical elements at the Japan Championships. In the current +5/-5GOE system he earned perfect scores for a spin, two step sequences, and a choreographic sequence. In addition, he got a perfect 10.00 in the interpretation component for his short program at the 2021–22 Japan Championships. In the old +3/-3GOE system he was rewarded seven maximum scores for six solo jumps and a jump combination.

Absolute best scores

Hanyu has scored ten times above 300 points in the combined total, four times since the 2018–19 season. He was the first skater to score above 300, 310, 320, and 330 points in international competition.

Hanyu has scored fifteen times above 100 points in the short program, seven times since the 2018–19 season. He was also the first skater to score above 100 and 110 points in international competition.

Hanyu has scored eight times above 200 points in the free skating, twice since the 2018–19 season. He was the first skater to score above 200, 210, and 220 points in international competition.

Detailed results

Senior level in +5/-5 GOE system

Senior level in +3/-3 GOE system

Junior level

See also

Yuzuru Hanyu series
Yuzuru Hanyu Olympic seasons
Ice shows produced by Yuzuru Hanyu
List of programs and publications of Yuzuru Hanyu

Other
List of Olympic medalists in figure skating
List of highest historical scores in figure skating
World Figure Skating Championships cumulative medal count
Grand Slam (figure skating)
Axel jump

Notes and references

Citations

Books and magazines cited

External links

Yuzuru Hanyu database at skatingscores.com

Yuzuru Hanyu
Career achievements of sportspeople
Figure skating-related lists
Figure skating records and statistics